Melbourne South was an electoral district of the Legislative Assembly in the Australian state of Victoria from 1889 to 1904.

Melbourne South was defined by the Electoral Act Amendment Act 1888 as:"Commencing on the Yarra River at Prince's Bridge; thence southerly by the St. Kilda-road to Park-street, South Melbourne; westerly by Park-street to Palmerston-crescent; south-westerly and westerly by Palmerston-crescent and Raglan-street to Cecil-street; north by Cecil-street to the St. Kilda Railway ; further north crossing the St. Kilda and Sandridge Railways and by Cecil-street extension to the Normanby-road; easterly crossing that road to White-street; north-westerly by White-street to the Yarra River; and easterly by the Yarra River to the commencing point."

      # = by-election

References

Former electoral districts of Victoria (Australia)
1889 establishments in Australia
1904 disestablishments in Australia